The Sheraton Grand Taipei Hotel is a 16-storey,  tall hotel located in Zhongzheng District, Taipei, Taiwan.

History
The Lai Lai Shangri-La Hotel opened on 24 March 1981. Sheraton Hotels and Resorts assumed management of the hotel in 1983, and it was renamed the Lai Lai Sheraton Hotel Taipei. It was the first Sheraton hotel in Taiwan. It was renamed the Sheraton Grand Taipei Hotel on 1 July 2002. The hotel underwent a general refurbishment in 2005 and now has 688 rooms and suites, 8 restaurants and provides facilities including a business center, fitness center, outdoor swimming pool and spa.

Restaurants and bars
source:
Sukhothai: A Thai restaurant offering traditional Thai cuisine.
The Lounge: Pub serving wine, light dining and afternoon tea.
Kitchen 12: An international buffet and open restaurant serving a variety of dishes from all around the world.
The Guest House: A Chinese restaurant providing traditional Szechuan and Yangzhou cuisine.
The Dragon: A Cantonese restaurant serving dim sum and other Chinese delicacies.
Pizza Pub: An Italian restaurant offering pizzas baked onsite. It is the first restaurant in Taiwan to be certified by the Italian Associazione Verace Pizzaiuoli Napoletani.
Momoyama: A Japanese restaurant offering sushi and other classic Japanese delicacies.
Antoine Room: A steakhouse offering premium steak with a comprehensive collection of wine.

Public transportation
The hotel is located around 14 minutes' walk or five minutes' drive from Taipei Main Station. The nearest metro station is Shandao Temple metro station on the Bannan line of Taipei Metro.

See also
Sheraton Hsinchu Hotel
Sheraton Taitung Hotel
Sheraton Taoyuan Hotel

References

External links

 Sheraton Grand Taipei Hotel official website
 Sheraton Grand Taipei Hotel official chain website

Grand Taipei
Hotel buildings completed in 1980
1981 establishments in Taiwan
2002 establishments in Taiwan
Hotels established in 1981
Hotels in Taipei